Lucilla Poston  is a physiologist specialising in problems during pregnancy. She is a professor of maternal and fetal health at King's College London.

Personal life and education
Poston attended Felsted School in 1970, one of the first girls to be educated there after the school became co-educational. She graduated with a degree in physiology from University College, London and was also awarded her doctorate by University of London.

Career and research
She was appointed as a professor in King's College in 1995. Poston's research is about disorders of pregnancy especially when caused by maternal nutrition, and how children's lives can be affected. She has a large multidisciplinary research team with research projects that focus on premature birth, pre-eclampsia and complications from maternal obesity. Poston founded and is Director of the Maternal and Fetal Research Unit which undertakes large-scale clinical trials.

Her early research was into the control of the circulatory system of the placenta showed its relevance to pre-eclampsia. She led a clinical trial that changed medical practice through demonstrating that anti-oxidant supplements did not prevent pre-eclampsia.

Publications
Poston is the author or co-author of over 440 scientific publications including:

Awards
In 2000, Poston was awarded the Joan Mott Prize Lecture by the Physiological Society. In 2009 she was elected to be a Fellow of the Academy of Medical Sciences. In 2010 Poston was awarded the G L Brown Prize Lecture by the Physiological Society. In 2017 she was made CBE for services to Women’s Health and appointed Emeritus Senior Investigator by the National Institute for Health Research (NIHR). In 2021 Poston was President of the International Society for Developmental Origins of Health and Disease.

References

Year of birth missing (living people)
Living people
21st-century British biologists
21st-century British women scientists
Academics of King's College London
Professorships at King's College London
British physiologists
Women physiologists
NIHR Senior Investigators
Commanders of the Order of the British Empire
Fellows of the Academy of Medical Sciences (United Kingdom)